Tricia is a feminine given name, often a short form (hypocorism) of Patricia. It may refer to:

People
 Patricia Tricia Brock (born 1979), American contemporary Christian singer-songwriter
 Tricia Brown (born 1979), Australian rugby union player
 Patricia Tricia Cast (born 1966), American actress
 Tricia Chuah (born 1982), Malaysian professional squash player
 Patricia Tricia Cotham (born 1978), American politician, member of the North Carolina House of Representatives
 Patricia Tricia Nixon Cox (born 1946), elder daughter of former US President Richard Nixon
 Tricia Cullop (born 1971), American women's college basketball head coach
 Tricia Dunn-Luoma (born 1974), American ice hockey player
 Tricia Flores (born 1979) long and triple jumper and sprinter from Belize
 Tricia Guild, British designer, entrepreneur and writer
 Tricia Helfer (born 1976), Canadian actress and model
 Tricia Hunter, a former California state Assemblywoman
 Tricia MacGregor (born 1970), Canadian curler
 Patricia Tricia Marwick (born 1953), Scottish politician
 Tricia Middleton (born 1972), Canadian installation artist
 Patricia Tricia Penrose (born 1970), English actress and singer
 Patricia Tricia Santos (volleyball) (born 1995),  Filipina volleyball player, actress and TV host
 Tricia Saunders (born 1966), American amateur wrestler
 Patricia Tricia Smith (born 1957), Canadian retired rower
 Tricia Stumpf (born 1970), American retired skeleton racer
 Tricia Sullivan (born 1968), American science fiction writer
 Patricia Tricia Walker (born 1964), British novelist
 Tricia Walsh-Smith (born 1956), English playwright and actress
 Tricia Wright (born 1958), English darts player 
Tricia Nkosi (born 2004- present)

Animals
 Tricia (elephant), an Asian elephant at the Perth Zoo
Fictional characters
 Patricia Tricia Armstrong, on the British soap opera Coronation Street
 Tricia Marie McMillan or Trillian (character), in The Hitchhiker's Guide to the Galaxy series
 Asian reporter Tricia Takinawa, in Family Guy

See also
 Trisha
 Trish

Feminine given names
Hypocorisms